Holliman is a surname. Notable people with the surname include:

Earl Holliman (born 1928), American actor
Gerod Holliman (born 1994), American football player
John Holliman (1948–1998), American journalist
L. Hugh Holliman, American politician
Shirlie Holliman (born 1962), English pop singer

See also
6711 Holliman, a main-belt asteroid